Events from the year 1136 in Ireland.

Incumbents
High King: Toirdelbach Ua Conchobair

Deaths

Mac Domhnaill Fhinn Ua Dubhda, King of Ui Fiachrach Muaidhe